Henry Foner (born 1932) is an Israeli chemist and author of a book about the Kindertransport that saved his life as a child just prior to World War II as the Nazis added territory in Europe.

Background

Foner was born "Heinz Lichtwitz" (nickname "Heini") in 1932 in Germany. In 1937, his mother died, so his grandparents helped raise him.  His grandfather was Ernst Lichtwitz, owner of a printing press.  Henry lived with his father, Max Lichtwitz and his mother, Ilse Lichtwitz nee Badt in 30 Kantstrasse, Charlottenburg, Berlin. A few months after the Kristallnacht, he was sent to the United Kingdom and arrived on February 3, 1939, in Swansea, Wales, to live with Morris and Winifred Foner, to whom he referred as his uncle and aunt. His father was sent to Auschwitz on December 9, 1942 and died a week later.

Career

Foner served in the British Army in Egypt and in Sudan from 1953 to 1955. He obtained a doctorate in chemistry from University of Leeds.

Personal

In 1968, Foner and his wife Judith moved to Jerusalem, Israel.  Although the UK saved his life, he considered Israel his homeland.

Foner and his wife married in 1960. They have three children: Naomi (1964) and David (1966) who were both born in Leeds, Great Britain, and Maya (1969) who was born in Jerusalem, Israel. They have eight grandchildren.
In 2016, regarding the death of Ernst Tremmel, a guard at Auschwitz, he commented:  There can never be a full sense of closure. For me, it does not make sense - you can not recover what was stolen.

Works
 Foner's book Postcards to a Little Boy chronicles his experience as a Kindertransport child.
 Postcards to a Little Boy:  A Kindertransport Story (2013)

See also
 Kindertransport

References

1932 births
Living people
Israeli chemists
Kindertransport refugees